Odeon Sky Filmworks is a joint venture between Odeon Cinemas and British Sky Broadcasting designed to bring film titles to UK audiences in cinemas and at home.

Called ‘Odeon and Sky Filmworks’ (FILMWORKS), the collaboration between SKY and ODEON will act as a UK-based film distributor, signing up titles directly from filmmakers. Filmworks plans initially to sign up to six films for release per year. Films will have a theatrical release at ODEON, as well as at other cinema chains, prior to DVD retail (including ODEON foyer sales) and DVD rental (including ODEON Direct). Sky will retain all UK TV rights – and will make the films available to Sky viewers across its download service – Sky Movies By Broadband, as well as Sky Box Office, before their UK Television Premiere on Sky Movies.

See also
 Odeon Cinemas
 British Sky Broadcasting

Entertainment companies of the United Kingdom
Film distributors of the United Kingdom
Odeon Cinemas